Golden Job is a 2018 Hong Kong action film directed by Chin Ka-lok, who also stars in the film alongside Ekin Cheng, Jordan Chan, Michael Tse and Jerry Lamb, reuniting the cast from the Young and Dangerous film series. The film was released in Hong Kong on 20 September 2018. Filming locations for Golden Job included Taiwan, Japan, Hungary, Montenegro, Beijing and Inner Mongolia.

Plot
Lion (Ekin Cheng), Crater (Jordan Chan), Bill (Michael Tse), Calm (Chin Ka-lok) and Mouse (Jerry Lamb) are five orphans adopted and mentored by Cho Sir (Eric Tsang), whom they refer to as Papa. The five of them grew up as sworn brothers and become mercenaries belonging to The Agency. One time, they orchestra a mission to steal a truck load of medicine from a pharmaceutical company to help African children. However, the truck turns out to be full of gold belonging to The Agency, which was a scheme set up by Bill. As Bill turns against the group, this eventually leads Lion imprisoned in Hungary and Cho crippled. After his release, Lion joins his brothers to settle their score with Bill.

Cast
Ekin Cheng as Lion (獅王), the rational and calm leader of the group.
Jordan Chan as Crater (火山), the short-tempered, but skilled marksman of the group.
Michael Tse as Bill Leung, the traitor of the group, who is greedy, bitter, and refuses to acknowledge his mistakes. He schemes to Rice to steal gold.
Chin Ka-lok as Calm (淡定), the group's ace driver.
Jerry Lamb as Mouse (老鼠), the simple-minded tech expert of the group.
Eric Tsang as Cho Sir (曹Sir), the adopted father and mentor of the five brothers, whom they refer to a Papa (阿爸).
Zhang Yamei as Lulu (璐璐), Cho's daughter
Yasuaki Kurata as Morimoto-San (森本), Cho's friend who resides in Fukuoka.
Phil Chang as Joe, deputy commissioner of The Agency who assists the group in locating Bill and the missing gold.
Charmaine Sheh as Dr. Zoey Chow (周醫生), Lion's girlfriend who is a Médecins Sans Frontières doctor working in Africa.
Sergej Onopko as Rick Rice, the group's former superior who schemes with Bill in stealing gold. He is later murdered by Bill after he insults him for betraying his brothers.
Billy Chow as Rice's main henchman who later works for Bill after the former was killed by Bill.
Alan Ng as Rice's Lead Henchman who constantly leads henchmen to eliminate the brothers.

Theme song
Song: Bro (一起衝一起闖)
Composer: Chan Kwong-wing
Lyricist: Chan Kwong-wing, Fiona Fung, Jeffrey Chu
Singer: Ekin Cheng, Jordan Chan, Michael Tse, Chin Ka-lok, Jerry Lamb

Reception

Critical reception
Elizabeth Kerr of The Hollywood Reporter and notes the film's nostalgic and entertaining value and praises the film's tech and action choreography. Edmund Lee of the South China Morning Post gave the film a score of 3/5 and calls it "a most contrived story that nevertheless entertains." Carey Darling of the Houston Chronicle gave the film a score of 2 stars out of 5 and criticizes its predictability and lack of substance. Andrew Saroch of Far East Films praises the film's set pieces and the casts' performances.

Box office
Golden Job grossed a total of US$47,279,677 worldwide, combining its box office gross from Hong Kong, China, United States and Australia.

In Hong Kong, the film grossed s total of HK$10,888,179 during its theatrical run from 20 September to 29 October 2018.

In China, the film grossed a total of ¥317,488,000.

Accolades

References

External links

黃金兄弟 Golden Job - 香港 on Facebook

2018 films
2018 action films
2010s heist films
Hong Kong action films
Hong Kong heist films
2010s Cantonese-language films
Films shot in Taiwan
Films shot in Japan
Films shot in Hungary
Films shot in Montenegro
Films shot in Beijing
Films shot in Inner Mongolia
2010s Hong Kong films